John Hayden (born December 2, 1968) is an American former professional stock car racing driver who competed in both the NASCAR Busch Series and the ARCA Re/Max Series from 2000 to 2006.

Racing career
Hayden first ran in the NASCAR Southeast Series in 1997, and would run one more race in the next 6 years.

In 2001, Hayden would make his ARCA Re/Max Series debut at Memphis Motorsports Park driving for Dan Kinney, where he would finish 25th after starting 14th. He would make three more starts that year and would get a best finish of fifth at the Illinois State Fairgrounds. He would make six more starts the following year, earning a best career finish of third in the first start of the year at Nashville Superspeedway. It was also during this year where Hayden would make his first NASCAR Busch Series debut at Phoenix International Raceway after failing to qualify at Lowe's Motor Speedway and Memphis.

In 2003, Hayden would run in a number of the Busch Series season with Kinney's team, Premier Motorsports, in the No. 85 Chevrolet, entering in seventeen races and qualifying for ten with a best finish of 18th at Nashville and Indianapolis Raceway Park. Hayden and Kinney would part ways at the end of the year.

Hayden would join Day Enterprises Racing in 2004, first driving the No. 61 Chevrolet at Nashville, finishing 32nd, and then driving the No. 16 for six races, only qualifying at Pikes Peak International Raceway and Memphis. After failing to qualify for five races at the beginning of the following year in 2005, he would return to Premier Motorsports at Pikes Peak, where he would finish 38th after starting in 22nd due to a brake issue. He would make one more Busch Series start the following year, running at the Milwaukee Mile, finishing 32nd due to a crash. It was during this time that he served as a crew member for Brewco Motorsports.

Hayden would go on to serve as a crew chief for Patrick Sheltra in the ARCA Re/Max Series in 2009, with his last start in auto racing coming at a CRA Street Stocks Series event at Kentucky Motor Speedway, where he would finish ninth.

Personal life
Hayden is currently the co-track operator of Kentucky Motor Speedway in Whitesville, Kentucky.

Motorsports career results

NASCAR
(key) (Bold – Pole position awarded by qualifying time. Italics – Pole position earned by points standings or practice time. * – Most laps led.)

Busch Series

ARCA Re/Max Series
(key) (Bold – Pole position awarded by qualifying time. Italics – Pole position earned by points standings or practice time. * – Most laps led.)

References

1968 births
Living people
NASCAR drivers
ARCA Menards Series drivers
Racing drivers from Kentucky
People from McLean County, Kentucky